WZBH (93.5 FM, "93.5 The Beach") is an American radio station licensed to serve the community of Salisbury, Maryland, Ocean City, Maryland, Southern Delaware, Virginia, and the rest of Delmarva, with studios and cluster offices located in Salisbury, Maryland. Its tower is located in Dagsboro, Delaware and stands . The station broadcasts as an active rock music formatted station branded as "93.5 The Beach". Programming features the Billy Madison Show, Paula, Glassman and HardDriveXL.

History 
Up until the late 1980s, this station had the call letters WSEA and featured a top-40 format. Call letters were changed to WZBH and a more mainstream AOR format was featured at first, and then an active rock format later. In September 2015, the studios were relocated from Georgetown, Delaware to Salisbury, Maryland.

External links

ZBH
Active rock radio stations in the United States
Millsboro, Delaware